Komo Rural LLG a local-level government (LLG) of Koroba-Kopiago District in Hela Province, Papua New Guinea.

Wards
01. Atare
02. Tumbite Ayagare
03. Egauwi
04. Eanda
05. Pami
06. Egaipa
08. Ayagate
09. Kulu Nogoli
10. Emberali
11. Padua
12. Kungu
13. Agu/Tani
14. Laiyako
15. Para
16. Laite
17. Mindirate
18. Pura
19. Turubi Tawanda
20. Tumbite Ligame
21. Yandare
22. Komo Rural Station
23. Gangulu
24. Mbeloba
25. Arali Kapale
26. Tagite
27. Kulu Pupa

References 

Local-level governments of Hela Province